{{Infobox person
| name = Fabian Kasi
| image =
| image_size =
| alt =
| caption =
| birth_date  = 
| birth_place = Matugga, Uganda
| nationality = Ugandan 
| alma_mater         =Makerere UniversityUniversity of Newcastle (Australia)Association of Chartered Certified Accountants| occupation = Accountant, bank executive, businessman
| years_active = 1990 - present
| title        = Managing director & chief executive officerCentenary Bank 
| spouse       =
}}Fabian Kasi''' is an accountant, bank executive, and businessman in Uganda, the third-largest economy in the East African Community. He is the managing director and chief executive officer of the Centenary Bank, with over US$573 million in assets.

Background and education
Kasi was born in 1967 in the town of Matugga in Wakiso District in the Central Region of Uganda. He attended St. Charles Lwanga Primary School, Matugga for his elementary schooling. He studied at St. Mary's College Kisubi for his O-level and A-level education. In 1988, he entered Makerere University, the oldest and largest public university in the country, graduating in 1991 with a Bachelor of Commerce degree in accounting. Later, he studied at the University of Newcastle (Australia), graduating with a Master of Business Administration degree. He is a fellow of the Association of Chartered Certified Accountants of the United Kingdom and a member of the Association of Certified Public Accountants of Uganda.

Career
Since he was an undergraduate student at Makerere, he has worked at a number of organisations, including:
 British American Tobacco, Uganda Limited
 Shell Uganda Limited
 PriceWaterhouseCoopers
 Makerere University
 University of Newcastle (Australia)
 Bank of Uganda
 Commercial Bank of Rwanda

In 2002, he was appointed the executive director of FINCA Uganda Limited, a Microfinance Deposit-taking Institution (MDI) in the country, serving there until 2010. In August 2010, he was appointed as the managing director and chief executive officer of Centenary Bank, where he still served as of January 2015. He is a member of the Rotary club of Kiwatule of which he is a Paul Harris Fellow(PHF)

Other considerations
Kasi is married with  6 children. He is the vice chairman of the Uganda Bankers Association.

See also
List of banks in Uganda
Banking in Uganda
Economy of Uganda
FINCA Uganda Limited

References

External links
 Website of Centenary Bank
  Hard Times For Banks As NPLs Rise, Growth Slows

Living people
1967 births
Ugandan businesspeople
Ugandan accountants
Ugandan bankers
Makerere University alumni
University of Newcastle (Australia) alumni
Ugandan chief executives
Ugandan business executives
Centenary Bank people